The Department of Mechanical, Aerospace & Civil Engineering (or "MACE") at the University of Manchester was formed from three departments in the 2004 merger between the Victoria University of Manchester (VUM) and the University of Manchester Institute of Science and Technology (UMIST). The merged departments were the Department of Civil and Construction Engineering which was joint between both universities, the Department of Mechanical Aerospace and Manufacturing Engineering at UMIST and the Manchester School of Engineering  at VUM.

History
Each of the former departments had long histories of excellence in engineering  including James Prescott Joule's part in the foundation of what was to become UMIST, Joseph Whitworth's contribution to founding both institutions and  Osborne Reynolds's  study of Fluid Mechanics and Thermodynamics in the 1890s.

The Whitworth Engineering Laboratories of Owens College were opened in 1886. In 1909 they were replaced by larger laboratories on Coupland Street and Bridgeford Street (a building now used for the School of Music and Drama). These in their turn were replaced in the 1960s by the Simon Engineering Building in Brunswick Street, finished in mid-1962. The school became a department as part of a faculty-wide change in 2019.

Present day

 the School has over 100 academics, over 1000 undergraduate students, 400 taught full-time and part-time postgraduate students and 200 postgraduate research students. The range of research topics studied by the students covers many areas of engineering, and includes theoretical and computational research, experimental studies, systems, design and management. Staff expertise encompasses a wide range of topics including aerospace, manufacturing and laser processing, extreme loading and design, structural engineering, fire engineering, process industries, nano-engineering, energy, environment and climate change, management of projects and nuclear graphite technology.

 the Head of School is Alice Larkin, Prof of Climate Science & Energy Policy.

The wide range of degree courses offered by the School are supported by extensive computational and experimental facilities such as the largest tilting flume in the world, built in conjunction with the Mason Centre for Environmental Flows and a £6 million upgrade of the George Begg Building which was also recently completed.

Professors of Engineering in Owens College and the Victoria University of Manchester
These were:
1868-1905: Osborne Reynolds
1905-08: S. Dunkerley
1908-19: J. E. Petavel
1920-49: A. H. Gibson
1945-46: D. R. Hartree, Professor of Engineering Physics
1950-unknown : J. L. Matheson

Professors of Mechanical Engineering in the Faculty of Technology of the Victoria University of Manchester (UMIST)
These were:
1905-13: J. T, Nicholson
1914-17: A, B, Field
1917-26: G. G. Stoney
1926-39: Dempster Smith
1940-unknown : H. Wright Baker

References

Departments of the University of Manchester
Manchester University
Mechanical engineering schools
Nuclear technology in the United Kingdom